Bian River may refer to:

Bian River (China)
Bian River (Indonesia)

See also 
 Bian (disambiguation)